Petrino is a rural locality (a village) in Voskresenskoye Rural Settlement, Cherepovetsky District, Vologda Oblast, Russia. The population was 86 as of 2002. There are 2 streets.

Geography 
Voskresenskoye is the nearest rural locality.

References 

Rural localities in Cherepovetsky District